Lowlands is a 1922 German silent film directed by Adolf E. Licho and starring Lil Dagover, based on the 1903 opera Tiefland. The story was later turned into a sound film Lowlands directed by and starring Leni Riefenstahl.

Cast
In alphabetical order

References

Bibliography

External links

1922 films
Films of the Weimar Republic
German silent feature films
Films directed by Adolf E. Licho
German films based on plays
Films based on operas
Films based on works by Àngel Guimerà
Films set in the 19th century
Films set in Spain
Films produced by Erich Pommer
German blacksmiths
1920s historical films
German historical films
UFA GmbH films
1920s German films